Roxley (also styled Roxley Games, or Roxley Game Laboratory) is a Canadian game development and publishing firm located in Calgary, Alberta. Their games include Super Motherload, Steampunk Rally, Santorini (a reimagining of 2004 release Santorini by designer Gordon Hamilton),   Brass: Lancashire (a reprint of 2007's Brass by designer Martin Wallace), its sequel, Brass: Birmingham and their game, Dice Throne, and the newly released Dice Throne Season Two. Roxley ran a record-breaking Kickstarter campaign for Santorini which raised $700,524 and is in the middle of a Kickstarter which is projected to break that record again.

References

External links

Board game publishing companies
Companies based in Calgary